Holmestrand is a point at the west side of Jossac Bight, on the south coast of South Georgia. The name appears on a chart based on surveys by DI personnel during 1925–30, but was probably applied earlier by Norwegian whalers operating from South Georgia.

References 

Headlands of South Georgia